The following lists events that happened during 1816 in Australia.

Incumbents
Monarch - George III

Governors
Governors of the Australian colonies:
Governor of New South Wales – Lachlan Macquarie
Lieutenant-Governor of Van Diemen's Land – Major Thomas Davey

Events
 30 March – Francis Greenway is appointed as the government's Civil Architect.
1 June – Andrew Bent starts regular publication of the Hobart Town Gazette and Southern Reporter.
30 November – Export of horses to India for use by the Indian Army begins with an advertisement in the Sydney Gazette.
2 December – John Oxley allots the first land grants in the Illawarra district.

Births
 27 February – William Nicholson, 3rd Premier of Victoria (born in the United Kingdom) (d. 1865)
 12 April – Sir Charles Gavan Duffy, 8th Premier of Victoria (born in the United Kingdom) (d. 1903)
 7 October – Edward Hargraves, gold prospector (born in the United Kingdom) (d. 1891)
 15 October – Sir John Robertson, 5th Premier of New South Wales (born in the United Kingdom) (d. 1891)
 23 December – Thomas Sutcliffe Mort, industrialist (born in the United Kingdom) (d. 1878)

References

 
Australia
Years of the 19th century in Australia